Cocking Causeway is a hamlet in the civil parish of Cocking, in the Chichester district, in the county of West Sussex, England.

References

External links

Hamlets in West Sussex
Chichester District